Franz Schilcher (born 19 August 1943) is an Austrian ice hockey and Tennis player. He competed in the men's tournaments at the 1968 Winter Olympics and the 1976 Winter Olympics.

References

External links
 , Olympics site , ITF Profile

1943 births
Living people
Austrian ice hockey players
Ice hockey players at the 1968 Winter Olympics
Ice hockey players at the 1976 Winter Olympics
Olympic ice hockey players of Austria
Sportspeople from Graz